The 2021 Barcelona Open Banc Sabadell (also known as the Torneo Godó) was a men's tennis tournament played on outdoor clay courts. It was the 68th edition of the event and part of the ATP Tour 500 series of the 2021 ATP Tour. It took place at the Real Club de Tenis Barcelona in Barcelona, Spain, from 19 to 25 April 2021.

The 2020 tournament was originally scheduled to be played on 20 to 26 April 2020. Due to the COVID-19 pandemic, local restrictions, and the suspension of all play on the ATP Tour, the 2020 edition was cancelled in March 2020.

Champions

Singles

  Rafael Nadal def.  Stefanos Tsitsipas, 6–4, 6–7(6–8), 7–5

Doubles

  Juan Sebastián Cabal /  Robert Farah def.  Kevin Krawietz /  Horia Tecău, 6–4, 6–2

Points and prize money

Points distribution

Prize money 

*per team

Singles main-draw entrants

Seeds

1 Rankings as of April 12, 2021.

Other entrants
The following players received wildcards into the main draw:
  Carlos Alcaraz 
  Jaume Munar 
  Lorenzo Musetti 
  Andrey Rublev

The following players received entry from the qualifying draw:
  Tallon Griekspoor
  Ilya Ivashka
  Andrey Kuznetsov
  Sumit Nagal
  Holger Rune
  Bernabé Zapata Miralles

The following player received entry as a lucky loser:
  Federico Gaio

Withdrawals 
Before the tournament
  Grigor Dimitrov → replaced by  Salvatore Caruso
  Lloyd Harris → replaced by  Thiago Monteiro
  Nick Kyrgios → replaced by  Jo-Wilfried Tsonga
  Reilly Opelka → replaced by  Pierre-Hugues Herbert
  Casper Ruud → replaced by  Federico Gaio
  Jan-Lennard Struff → replaced by  Gilles Simon

Defaults 
  Fabio Fognini

Retirements 
  David Goffin

Doubles main-draw entrants

Seeds

 Rankings are as of April 12, 2021.

Other entrants
The following pairs received wildcards into the doubles main draw:
  Carlos Alcaraz /  Pablo Carreño Busta
  Feliciano López /  Marc López

The following pair received entry from the qualifying draw:
  Adrian Mannarino /  Benoît Paire

Withdrawals 
Before the tournament
  Jamie Murray /  Bruno Soares →  Cristian Garín /  Guido Pella
  Ivan Dodig /  Franko Škugor →  Ivan Dodig /  Jamie Murray
During the tournament
  Carlos Alcaraz /  Pablo Carreño Busta

References

External links

Barcelona Open Banc Sabadell
2021
2021 in Spanish tennis
April 2021 sports events in Spain